Natsue Yoshimura (吉村夏枝 Yoshimura Natsue, born 19 August 1973) is a former J-pop singer and member of the groups Lip's and Nanatsuboshi. She was born in Shimane Prefecture, Japan, and made her debut on 21 March 1990.

External links 
 

1973 births
Living people
Japanese women pop singers
Japanese idols
Japanese actresses
Japanese television personalities
Musicians from Shimane Prefecture
21st-century Japanese singers
21st-century Japanese women singers